Alessandro Foglietta (born 1 February 1953, in Supino)
is an Italian politician and
Member of the European Parliament
for Central
with the Alleanza Nazionale, Treasurer of the Union for a Europe of Nations and
sits on
the European Parliament's Committee on the Environment, Public Health and Food Safety.

He is a substitute for the Committee on Budgetary Control
and the Committee on Economic and Monetary Affairs. He is also a member of the
Delegation to the EU-Chile Joint Parliamentary Committee.

Education
 Diploma in accounting studies
 1976: Commercial representative
 office worker (1979) and managing director (1986) in private industry
 1970: Section Secretary of the Youth Front
 1980: Secretary of the MSI, Supino (Frosinone) section (1976) then provincial leader of Frosinone
 1988: Member of the Central Committee of MSI

Career
 1997–2004: Chairman of the Frosinone provincial Federation of AN
 AN official responsible for 'social cohesion'
 Deputy Mayor (1993) and Municipal Councillor (1994–2005) of Supino
 Regional Councillor (1996–2005) of Lazio Region

See also
 2004 European Parliament election in Italy

External links
 
 
 

1953 births
Living people
National Alliance (Italy) MEPs
MEPs for Italy 2004–2009
21st-century Italian politicians